In Egyptian hieroglyphs, a cartouche  is an oval with a line at one end tangent to it, indicating that the text enclosed is a royal name. The first examples of the cartouche are associated with pharaohs at the end of the Third Dynasty, but the feature did not come into common use until the beginning of the Fourth Dynasty under Pharaoh Sneferu. While the cartouche is usually vertical with a horizontal line, if it makes the name fit better it can be horizontal, with a vertical line at the end (in the direction of reading). Demotic script reduced the cartouche to a pair of brackets and a vertical line.

Of the five royal titularies it was the prenomen (the throne name), and the "Son of Ra" titulary (the so-called nomen name given at birth), which were enclosed by a cartouche.

At times amulets took the form of a cartouche displaying the name of a king and placed in tombs. Archaeologists often find such items important for dating a tomb and its contents. Cartouches were formerly only worn by pharaohs. The oval surrounding their name was meant to protect them from evil spirits in life and after death. The cartouche has become a symbol representing good luck and protection from evil. 

The term "cartouche" was first applied by French soldiers who fancied that the symbol they saw so frequently repeated on the pharaonic ruins they encountered resembled a muzzle-loading firearm's paper powder cartridge ( in French).

As a hieroglyph, a cartouche can represent the Egyptian-language word for "name". It is listed as no. V10 in Gardiner's Sign List.
The cartouche in half-section, Gardiner no. V11 (as seen below) has a separate meaning in the Egyptian language as a determinative for actions and nouns dealing with items: "to divide", "to exclude". V11
The cartouche hieroglyph is used as a determinative for Egyptian language šn-(sh)n, for "circuit", or "ring"-(like the shen ring or the cartouche). Later it was used for rn, the word "name". The word can also be spelled as "r" with "n", the mouth over the horizontal n. V10  D21:N35

See also

 Serekh, a predecessor to the cartouche

References

Betrò, 1995. Hieroglyphics: The Writings of Ancient Egypt, Betrò, Maria Carmela, c. 1995, 1996-(English), Abbeville Press Publishers, New York, London, Paris (hardcover)

External links

Ancient Egyptian Cartouche facts

3rd-millennium BC establishments in Egypt
Ornaments (architecture)
Ancient Egyptian symbols
Royal titles
Egyptian hieroglyphs: rope-fiber-baskets-bags
Egyptian hieroglyphs